Coenochroa is a genus of snout moths. It was described by Ragonot, in 1887.

Species
 Coenochroa bipunctella (Barnes & McDunnough, 1913) 
 Coenochroa californiella Ragonot, 1887
 Coenochroa chilensis Shaffer, 1992 
 Coenochroa dentata Shaffer, 1989 
 Coenochroa prolixa Shaffer, 1989 
 Coenochroa illibella (Hulst, 1887)

References

Phycitinae
Pyralidae genera
Taxa named by Émile Louis Ragonot